Luisa Merea (born 24 September 1958) is a Peruvian volleyball player. She competed in the women's tournament at the 1976 Summer Olympics.

References

1958 births
Living people
Peruvian women's volleyball players
Olympic volleyball players of Peru
Volleyball players at the 1976 Summer Olympics
Place of birth missing (living people)
20th-century Peruvian women